Edoardo Bovolon (born 5 June 1998) is an Italian football player who plays for  club San Donato.

Club career
He made his professional debut in the Lega Pro for Pordenone on 8 May 2016 in a game against Giana Erminio.

References

External links
 

1998 births
Sportspeople from Udine
Footballers from Friuli Venezia Giulia
Living people
Italian footballers
Association football midfielders
Udinese Calcio players
Pordenone Calcio players
Como 1907 players
San Donato Tavarnelle players
Serie B players
Serie C players
Serie D players